Joel Allen Barber (January 17, 1809 – June 28, 1881) was an American lawyer and politician.  He served two terms in the United States House of Representatives from Wisconsin's 3rd congressional district, he was the 15th Speaker of the Wisconsin State Assembly, and he served one term in the Wisconsin State Senate.

Early life and education
Barber was born in the town of Georgia, in Franklin County, Vermont, to Joel and Aseneth Melvin Barber. He worked on a farm until age 18, then entered the Georgia Academy.  After graduating from the academy, he attended the University of Vermont in Burlington, where he studied law. He left the university after two and a half years and read law with George P. Marsh. He was admitted to the bar in 1833 in Prince George's County, Maryland, where he was teaching school, and commenced practice in Fairfield, Vermont.

Career

Barber moved to the Wisconsin Territory in 1837, settling in Lancaster, in Grant County, where he continued to practice law. He served as county clerk for Grant County, for four years and as district attorney for three terms. He served as member of the first constitutional convention of Wisconsin in 1846.

Barber was elected to the Wisconsin State Assembly in 1852, 1853, as a Whig, in 1863 as a Republican, and, 1864, on the National Union ticket.  He was elected speaker for the 1863 session. He also served one two-year term as Grant County's representative in the Wisconsin State Senate in 1856 and 1857.

After establishing a law partnership with George Clementson in 1869, Barber was elected to the United States House of Representatives as a Republican, serving in the Forty-second and Forty-third Congresses from March 4, 1871, to March 3, 1875. He served as the representative of Wisconsin's 3rd congressional district. While Barber was serving in Congress, George Clementson conducted the legal work of their firm. Barber was not a candidate for renomination in 1874, and was succeeded by Henry S. Magoon. Upon leaving Congress, he resumed the practice of law with Clementson.

Death

Barber died in Lancaster, Wisconsin, June 28, 1881, following an attack of peritonitis and was interred in Hillside Cemetery.

Notes

Sources

1809 births
1881 deaths
People from Georgia, Vermont
Republican Party Wisconsin state senators
Republican Party members of the Wisconsin State Assembly
People from Lancaster, Wisconsin
Republican Party members of the United States House of Representatives from Wisconsin
19th-century American politicians
American lawyers admitted to the practice of law by reading law
Speakers of the Wisconsin State Assembly